Jack Ellis (born 20 December 1933) is a former Australian rules footballer who played with Carlton in the Victorian Football League (VFL).

Notes

External links 

Jack Ellis's profile at Blueseum

1933 births
Carlton Football Club players
Living people
Australian rules footballers from Victoria (Australia)